Robert Wilson and the Civil Wars is a 1985 documentary by Howard Brookner about Robert Wilson’s ambitious attempt to stage an epic, twelve-hour, multinational opera for the 1984 Summer Olympics.

Synopsis
Robert Wilson and the Civil Wars is an in-depth documentation of Robert Wilson’s ambitious attempt to stage an epic, twelve-hour, multinational opera for the 1984 Summer Olympics. Filmmaker Howard Brookner follows the avant-garde theatre director as he confronts a hectic work schedule, funding difficulties and relentless international travel in attempt to complete his preparations.

The film examines Wilson’s unique theatrical style during The Civil Wars: A Tree Is Best Measured When It Is Down, which involves the continual creation of evocative stage sets, owing to a unique juxtaposition of movement, sound, text and image. Known for his precise, painterly images Wilson’s work derives more from visual art than the orthodox literary traditions of theatre. As a result, Wilson often challenges actors to perform in a boldly minimalist style, as well as collaborating with non-actors, such as young autistic poet Christopher Knowles in Einstein on the Beach.

Cast
 Robert Wilson
 Philip Glass
 Heiner Müller
 Lucinda Childs
 Sheryl Sutton
 Ingrid Andree
 Bénédicte Pesle
 Gavin Bryars
 Michel Guy
 Isabel Eberstadt
 Christopher Knowles

Production

Like Howard Brookner’s earlier film Burroughs: The Movie, Robert Wilson and the Civil Wars features unique access to its subject, as well as an impressive host of interviewees, including Wilson’s long-term composer Philip Glass, Heiner Müller, Lucinda Childs, Sheryl Sutton, Ingrid Andree, Bénédicte Pesle, Gavin Bryars, Michel Guy, Isabel Eberstadt and Christopher Knowles. Howard Brookner also narrates part of the film himself, which he shot on 16mm in Minneapolis, Rome, Rotterdam, Cologne, Tokyo and Marseille.

References

External links
 
 Robert Wilson and the Civil Wars at Mubi

American documentary films
1985 films
1984 Summer Olympics
Documentary films about theatre
1980s English-language films
1980s American films